Joseph Thomas Gordan Shaughnessy (born 6 July 1992) is an Irish professional defender who plays for St Mirren. Shaughnessy has previously played for Southend United, Aberdeen, Forfar Athletic, Falkirk and St Johnstone. He has represented the Republic of Ireland national under-21 football team at international level.

Early and personal life
His younger brother Conor is also a professional footballer with League One side, Burton Albion.

Club career

Aberdeen
Shaughnessy signed for Aberdeen in June 2009, having previously played for Irish club Salthill Devon as a youngster. Shaughnessy made his debut on 14 May 2011 against Hibernian. A few days before making his debut, he signed a contract extension on a two-year deal.

On 30 August 2011, Shaughnessy went on loan to Forfar Athletic until January, along with Nicky Low. Shaughnessy made his debut for the club on 11 September 2011 in a 1–0 win against Brechin City. He then scored his first goal for the club, in a 4–2 win over Stirling Albion on 17 September 2011. Shaughnessy would score twice in two games; in a 4–3 loss against East Fife on 1 October 2011 and another in a 1–1 draw against Arbroath on 15 October 2011.

Ahead of the fourth round of the Scottish Cup, a tie against his parent club, manager Dick Campbell says he wouldn't put Shaughnessy and Low in the match against his parent club. Aberdeen won 4–0 and progressed to the next round. After impressing on loan, he went back to Forfar until the end of the 2011–12 season. He went on to make 26 appearances and scored three times.

Ahead of the 2012–13 season, manager Craig Brown believed Shaughnessy and Low had performed well at Forfar Athletic and considered him using them in the first team in the near future. In pre-season friendly matches, Shaughnessy scored twice in a 12–0 win over VfB Alstatte and a 2–1 win over Manchester United as part of Neil Simpson testimonial on 14 August 2012. On 7 December 2012, Shaughnessy signed a contract extension with Aberdeen until 2015. He scored his first competitive goal for Aberdeen four days later in the Scottish Cup 4th Round Replay win over Motherwell.

In the 2013–14 season, Shaughnessy played in the right-back position at the start of the season. Shaughnessy was even compared to Richard Gough, due to his playing style. Shaughnessy scored his first goal of the season, in the third round of the Scottish League Cup, in a 5–0 win over Falkirk. He then received a red card in a 2–0 win over Motherwell on 30 October 2013. It was his first red card of his professional career and this resulted in him missing some matches. Shaughnessy subsequently had his first team opportunities limited, as Shaleum Logan or Ryan Jack were preferred in the right-back position.

Shaughnessy did not start a game for Aberdeen in the early part of the 2014–15 season and was loaned out to Falkirk. He made his debut on 6 September 2014, as Falkirk lost 1–0 against Stranraer in the Scottish Challenge Cup. After making nine appearances for the club, it was announced that Shaughnessy would return to his parent club on 3 January 2015. Following his return, Shaughnessy made two more appearances, including making his first start, in a 1–0 loss against St Johnstone in the last game of the season.

On 14 May 2015, Shaughnessy was named as one of seven players who would be leaving Aberdeen at the end of the season, having not been offered a new contract.

St Johnstone
Shaughnessy signed a pre-contract agreement with St Johnstone on 20 May 2015, agreeing a two-year deal. In October 2017, he was named as St Johnstone captain, replacing Steven Anderson in the role. He left St Johnstone at the end of the 2018–19 season.

Southend United
After a trial spell with Southend United, he subsequently signed a one-year deal with the Shrimpers on 1 August 2019.

St. Mirren
On 20 July 2020, Shaughnessy signed a two-year deal with St. Mirren. He was named vice-captain in October, before becoming the captain in January following the departure of Sam Foley. On 21 May 2021 Shaughnessy signed a contract extension with the club lasting until 2023.

International career
In May 2010, he was called up to the Republic of Ireland Under-18 squad.
In January 2013, Shaughnessy was called up to the Republic of Ireland Under-21 squad.

Career statistics

Honours
Scottish Premier League Young Player of the Month: December 2012.

References

External links

1992 births
Living people
Association football defenders
Republic of Ireland association footballers
Aberdeen F.C. players
Forfar Athletic F.C. players
Scottish Football League players
Scottish Premier League players
Scottish Professional Football League players
Republic of Ireland under-21 international footballers
Falkirk F.C. players
St Johnstone F.C. players
Salthill Devon F.C. players
Association footballers from County Galway
Mervue United A.F.C. players
Southend United F.C. players
St Mirren F.C. players